Gabala FK is an Azerbaijani professional football club based in Qabala.

This list encompasses the major records set by the club and their players in the Azerbaijan Premier League. The player records section includes details of the club's goalscorers and those who have made more than 50 appearances in first-team competitions.

Player

Most appearances 

Players played over 50 competitive, professional matches only. Appearances as substitute (goals in parentheses) included in total.

Goal scorers 

Competitive, professional matches only, appearances including substitutes appear in brackets.

Internationals

Team

Record wins
Record win: 8–0; v Neftchi Baku, 2016–17 Azerbaijan Premier League, 10 September 2016, & v Mil-Muğan, 2017-18 Azerbaijan Cup, 29 November 2017
Record League win: 8–0 v Neftchi Baku, 2016–17 Azerbaijan Premier League, 10 September 2016
Record Azerbaijan Cup win: 8–0 v Mil-Muğan, 2017-18 Azerbaijan Cup, 29 November 2017
Record away win: 8–0 v Neftchi Baku, 2016–17 Azerbaijan Premier League, 10 September 2016
Record home win: 8–0 v Mil-Muğan, 2017-18 Azerbaijan Cup, 29 November 2017

Record defeats
Record defeat: 0–4
v Khazar Lankaran, 2006-07 Azerbaijan Premier League, 9 December 2006
v Inter Baku, 2007-08 Azerbaijan Premier League, 28 May 2008
Record League defeat: 0–4
v Khazar Lankaran, 2006-07 Azerbaijan Premier League, 9 December 2006
v Inter Baku, 2007-08 Azerbaijan Premier League, 28 May 2008
Record away defeat: 0–4
v Khazar Lankaran, 2006-07 Azerbaijan Premier League, 9 December 2006
v Inter Baku, 2007-08 Azerbaijan Premier League, 28 May 2008
Record Azerbaijan Cup defeat: 0–5
v Inter Baku, Semi-Final 1st leg, 29 April 2009
Record home defeat: 1–4
v Karvan, Azerbaijan Premier League, 17 September 2006	
v Neftchi Baku, Azerbaijan Premier League, 2 April 2007

Wins/draws/losses in a season
 Most wins in a league season: 22 – 2005–06
 Most draws in a league season: 14 – 2009–10
 Most defeats in a league season: 16 – 2006-07
 Fewest wins in a league season: 4 – 2006-07
 Fewest draws in a league season: 4 – 2006-07
 Fewest defeats in a league season: 2 – 2005–06

Goals
 Most League goals scored in a season: 72 – 2005–06
 Most Premier League goals scored in a season: 43 – 2011–12
 Fewest League goals scored in a season: 17 – 2006-07
 Most League goals conceded in a season: 48 – 2009–10
 Fewest League goals conceded in a season: 14 – 2005–06

Points
 Most points in a season:
72 in 30 matches, First Division,2005–06
 Fewest points in a season:
16 in 24 matches, Azerbaijan Premier League, 2006-07

References

http://gabalafc.az/?mod=news&id=363&lang=en

External links 
 Official Website
 FK Qəbələ at AFFA.AZ
 FK Qəbələ at UEFA.COM
 FK Qəbələ at EUFO.DE
 FK Qəbələ at Weltfussball.de
 FK Qəbələ at Football-Lineups.com

Gabala FC
Gabala FC